Syllomatia xythopterana is a species of moth of the family Tortricidae. It is found in Australia, where it has been recorded from New South Wales, Victoria and Tasmania. The habitat consists of open forests.

The wingspan is about 17.5 mm.

References

Moths described in 1881
Tortricinae